Professor Stephen Cheung Yan-Leung, BBS, JP is the current President of the Education University of Hong Kong (EdUHK). He has presided over the institution since September 2013 before the Hong Kong Institute of Education (HKIEd) was renamed EdUHK when the Chief Executive in Council granted the institute a university title.

Cheung specialises in Corporate Finance, Investment and Financial Market Development. He has authored or co-authored over a 100 publications, one of which won the Sun Yefang Financial Innovation Award in 2014. He was ranked the sixth most productive finance scholar in the Asia-Pacific Region in the 1990s.
He is the President and Chair Professor of Public Policy.

He is a recipient of the Officier dans l'Ordre des Palmes Académiques.

References 

Year of birth missing (living people)
Living people
Heads of universities in Hong Kong
Alumni of the Chinese University of Hong Kong
Members of the Election Committee of Hong Kong, 2021–2026